Oreta speciosa is a moth in the family Drepanidae. It was described by Felix Bryk in 1943. It is found in China (Henan, Hubei, Fujian, Sichuan, Tibet) and Myanmar.

The length of the forewings is about 20 mm. Adults are similar to Oreta obtusa, but there is a transparent round spot in the cell.

References

Moths described in 1943
Drepaninae